Neptunium(III) chloride or neptunium trichloride is an inorganic compound with a chemical formula NpCl3. This salt is strongly radioactive.

Production
Neptunium(III) chloride can be produced by reducing neptunium(IV) chloride by ammonia or hydrogen at 350~400 °C:
2{NpCl4}+{H2}\longrightarrow 2{NpCl3}+2{HCl}

Chemical properties
Neptunium(III) chloride hydrolyzes at 450 °C and forms an oxychloride NpOCl.

References

Neptunium compounds
Chlorides
Actinide halides